Valve Kirsipuu (5 March 1933 Tallinn – 20 September 2017 Corfu) was an Estonian economist and politician. She was a member of the VII, VIII and IX Riigikogu.

On 10 September 2017, Valve Kirsipuu had a heart attack while swimming on the island of Corfu in Greece. She was hospitalized, but died ten days later in hospital on Corfu, aged 84.

References

1933 births
2017 deaths
20th-century Estonian economists
Women economists
Social Democratic Party (Estonia) politicians
Women members of the Riigikogu
Members of the Riigikogu, 1995–1999
Members of the Riigikogu, 1999–2003
Tallinn University of Technology alumni
Academic staff of the Tallinn University of Technology
Politicians from Tallinn
Members of the Riigikogu, 1992–1995
21st-century Estonian women politicians